USS Covington (PF-56), a , was the third ship of the United States Navy to be named for Covington, Kentucky. Covington, with a United States Coast Guard crew, served as a weather ship off Newfoundland through early 1946. She was decommissioned in April 1946 and turned over to the U.S. Coast Guard and commissioned the same day as USCGC Covington (PF-56) and remained in service through September. She was returned to the U.S. Navy at that time and placed in reserve. In April 1947, she was struck from the Naval Vessel Register and, in August, sold to the Ecuadorian Navy. As BAE Guayas (E-21), she served as the flagship of the Ecuadorian Navy from her acquisition through 1967. She was decommissioned in 1972 and stricken in 1974.

Construction
Covington (PF-56) was launched on 15 July 1943, by Globe Shipbuilding Company., Superior, Wisconsin, under a Maritime Commission contract; sponsored by Miss. J. Phillips; transferred to the Navy on 5 August 1944; placed in "ferry" commission on 7 August 1944; and commissioned in full on 17 October 1944.

Service history
Covington arrived at NS Argentia, Newfoundland, on 25 December 1944, for duty as a weather patrol vessel. She remained on this duty, except for overhauls at Boston and Charleston, South Carolina, until 16 March 1946, when she was decommissioned and loaned to the Coast Guard. Covington was returned from the Coast Guard on 17 September 1946, and sold to Ecuador through the Foreign Liquidation Commission of the State Department on 28 August 1947. Guayas was decommissioned in 1972 and stricken in 1974.

Notes

References

External links 
 
 

Tacoma-class frigates
Ships built in Superior, Wisconsin
1943 ships
World War II patrol vessels of the United States
Ships transferred from the United States Navy to the United States Coast Guard
Ships transferred from the United States Navy to the Ecuadorian Navy
Frigates of the Ecuadorian Navy
Weather ships